The Boss Rider of Gun Creek is a 1936 American Western film directed by Lesley Selander and written by Frances Guihan. The film stars Buck Jones, Muriel Evans, Harvey Clark, Alphonse Ethier, Tom Chatterton and Josef Swickard. The film was released on December 1, 1936, by Universal Pictures.

Cast       
Buck Jones as Larry Day / Gary Elliott
Muriel Evans as Starr Landerson
Harvey Clark as Pop Greer
Alphonse Ethier as Doc. Northrup 
Tom Chatterton as Sheriff Blaine
Josef Swickard as Lafe Turner
Ernest Hilliard as Banker Ed Randall
Edward Keane as Lawyer 
Mahlon Hamilton as Red Vale
Lee Phelps as Sheriff Lem Morrison
Allan Sears as Henchman Slim
W. E. Lawrence as Henchman Blackie 
Guy Edward Hearn as Mal MacGregor
Silver as Larry's Horse

References

External links
 

1936 films
American Western (genre) films
1936 Western (genre) films
Universal Pictures films
Films directed by Lesley Selander
American black-and-white films
1930s English-language films
1930s American films